Tor Bomann-Larsen (born 26 April 1951) is a Norwegian illustrator, children's writer, non-fiction writer, novelist and government scholar.

Biography 
Tor Bomann-Larsen was born in Jevnaker, Oppland, and started his career as a satirical illustrator for various newspapers, including Friheten, Ny tid, Dagbladet, Nationen and Arbederbladet. He has written biographies of explorers Fridtjof Nansen and Roald Amundsen and writer Sigurd Christiansen. 

He was awarded the Cappelen Prize for 1993, and the Brage Prize for non-fiction in 2004. The Brage Prize was awarded for Bomann-Larsens second volume of his biography of King Haakon VII and Queen Maud of Norway. After seven volumes, the latest published in 2016, the time period covers more than 70 years, from the birth of Princess Maud of Wales in 1869 until the relationship between the US president Franklin D. Roosevelt and Crown Princess Märtha during World War II.

References

1951 births
Living people
People from Jevnaker
Norwegian illustrators
Norwegian children's writers
Norwegian non-fiction writers
20th-century Norwegian novelists
21st-century Norwegian novelists